Tsable Lake is a lake located on Vancouver Island, Canada, south east of Comox Lake.

References

Alberni Valley
Lakes of Vancouver Island
Nelson Land District